Dark Sneak Love Action is the fourth studio album by Tom Tom Club, released in 1991. It includes the band's cover version of the Hot Chocolate track, "You Sexy Thing."

The album's final track, "Daddy Come Home," contains a sample of "Measure Up," a track from the band's 1983 album Close to the Bone.

Critical reception
The Encyclopedia of Popular Music called the album "experimental" and "funky." Trouser Press deemed it a "thoroughly delightful and diverse multi-cultural exposition on easygoing, sexy pop rhythmotics."

Billboard called lead single "Sunshine and Ectasy" a "kinetic pop/dance gem."

Track listing
All songs written by Tina Weymouth, Chris Frantz, Mark Roule and Bruce Martin except where noted.
 "Love Wave" – 5:13
 "Sunshine and Ecstasy" – 5:09
 "You Sexy Thing" (Errol Brown, Tony Wilson) – 3:46
 "Who Wants an Ugly Girl?" – 4:54
 "Say I Am" – 4:54
 "Irresistible Party Dip" – 5:11
 "Dark Sneak Love Action" – 4:21
 "Innocent Sex Kiss" – 4:00
 "Dogs in the Trash" – 4:28
 "My Mama Told Me" – 4:33
 "As the Disco Ball Turns" – 5:48
 "Daddy Come Home" (Frantz, Martin, Dougie Pincock, Roule, Weymouth) – 5:27

Personnel
Tom Tom Club
Tina Weymouth – bass guitar, vocals
Chris Frantz – drums, percussion, vocals
Lani Weymouth, Victoria Clamp – vocals
Mark Roule – guitar, vocals
Bruce Martin – computer programming, percussion, keyboards, accordion, vocals

References

1991 albums
Sire Records albums
Tom Tom Club albums
Fontana Records albums
Funk rock albums by American artists
Albums produced by Chris Frantz
Albums produced by Tina Weymouth